Lloyd Dane (August 19, 1925 – December 11, 2015) was a NASCAR Grand National Series driver from Eldon, Missouri. He participated part-time in the 1951 and 1954 to 1964 seasons, capturing four wins, all in his own car. Two of Dane's wins came during the 1956 season, when he finished 23rd in points.

Dane first started racing in 1949 and was the first NASCAR Pacific Coast Late Model Series champion; he took the championship in 1954, 1956 and 1957. He was noted for driving a Hudson Hornet, which he drove to his 1954 championship, along with longtime friend Tim Flock.

References

External links
 

1925 births
NASCAR drivers
People from Eldon, Missouri
Racing drivers from Missouri
2015 deaths